Harpale (हरपळे) is a surname used by a subclan of Maratha. The name is legendary among Maratha Royalties. They were honoured as Sardar, Patil, Deshmukh, etc. The Maratha Community come mostly from Maharashtra and neighbouring states. Harphales capital is Phursungi town near Pune. They have a Royal Mark of Gaikwad Maharajas of Baroda. They possess Deshmukh rights of villages in Nagpur. Their relations are associated with the prominent Maratha clan of 96 Royal Clans.

History
Harpales are considered to be descendants of King Haru. They also trace their origin to the Gaikwad Maharajas of Baroda. They were Maratha Sardars who came to Pune to support the Prime Ministers (Peshwas) of Maratha Kingdom, after defeat In the Panipat War. Their contribution in Maratha Empire Expansion in India was to fight in wars. Originally Harpale or Gaikwad belonged to the Chittorgah royal Rajput clan. Kalbhairav and Chamunda Devi of Chittodhgadh are Harpale's main kuldaivats.

Clan

Harpale
Lineage: Brahmavansha, descended from the Brahmavanshi king Haru.
Original seat: Phursungi, Pune, Maharashtra, Jaipur Rajasthan & Pune Area
Colour of sign, horse and throne: White colour
Heraldic sign (Nishan): Moon on flagpole
Clan goddess: Bhavani
Clan object (Devak):  Sunflower(Suryaful)
Guru: Varuna rishi
Gotra: Haru
Veda: Rigveda.
Other surnames: Zumbre, Devaskar, Dapse, Durge, Dugane, Devtole, Davtole, Dhavas, Dhavkar, Lahul, Lotankar, Verulkar, Vesange, Shahapure, Somavanshi, Sukshen, Songire, Husangbage, Dudhane.(Dudhane have PAWAR Kuli and Edge of sward is devak. How they have Harpale Kuli?) (Total 20)

Notables 
Shri Sadguru Limbaraj Maharaj ( Sanjivan Samadhi At Fursungi)
Shrimant Rayaji Harpale, Maratha General Under service of Peshwa(Chatrapati Bhosale Maharaja of Satara) along with 4000 cavalry.
Shrimant Sayaji Rao Harpale, Maratha General Under service of Peshwa. (Chatrapati Bhosale Maharaja of Satara)
Shrimant Siyaji Rao Harpale, Decendents, Devajirao Harpale, Ramjirao Harpale, Sayajirao Harpale, Sampatroaji Harpale, Gangaraoji Harpale, Chimajirao Harpale, bhauraoji Harpale, Chimajirao Harpale, Fakiraoji Harpale, Shivramji Harpale, Baburao Harpale, Gulabraoji Harpale, Dattataryji Harpale, Harshwardhanrao Harpale, Shivji Harpale 
Recent Phrusungi thrown Holders,
Harshwardhanrao Harpale after the death of Dattataryji 
UDAYJI GULABRAO HARPALE, SHIVJI HARPALE

See also
 Marathi people
 Maratha Empire
 Maratha clan system
 List of Maratha dynasties and states
 Bhonsle
 Gaekwad
 Scindia
 Parmar
 Holkar
 Peshwa

Sources

Marathi language

English

 </ref>

 

Surnames